The 2021 Men's EuroHockey Championship was the 18th edition of the Men's EuroHockey Championship, the biennial international men's field hockey championship of Europe organised by the European Hockey Federation.

The tournament was held alongside the women's tournament at the Wagener Stadium in Amstelveen, Netherlands and was originally scheduled to take place from 20 to 29 August 2021. However, following the postponement of the 2020 Summer Olympics to July and August 2021 because of the COVID-19 pandemic the tournament was rescheduled and took place from 4 to 13 June 2021.

The top five teams qualified for the 2023 FIH Hockey World Cup. The hosts Netherlands won the tournament for the sixth time, beating Germany in a 4–1 penalty shoot out after a 2–2 tie. The previous title holders Belgium won the bronze medal, defeating England with 3–2.

Qualification
Along the hosts, the Netherlands, the top 5 teams at the 2019 EuroHockey Championship, which was held in Antwerp from 16 to 24 August, and the top 2 teams from the 2019 EuroHockey Championships II qualified. The numbers in brackets are the pre-tournament world rankings of when the draw was made.

Squads

Preliminary round
The pools were announced on 11 May 2020.

All times are local (UTC+2).

Pool A

Pool B

Fifth to eighth place classification
The points obtained in the preliminary round against the other team were carried over.

First to fourth place classification

Semi-finals

Third and fourth place

Final

Statistics

Final standings

Awards
The following awards were given at the conclusion of the tournament.

Goalscorers

See also
2021 Men's EuroHockey Championship II
2021 Women's EuroHockey Nations Championship

References

External links

 
Men's EuroHockey Nations Championship
Men 1
EuroHockey Championship
International field hockey competitions hosted by the Netherlands
EuroHockey Championship
Sports competitions in Amstelveen
EuroHockey Championship
EuroHockey Championship